Carlo Testi (27 November 1902 – 12 November 2005) was an Italian painter. His work was part of the painting event in the art competition at the 1932 Summer Olympics.

See also
 List of centenarians (artists, painters and sculptors)

References

1902 births
2005 deaths
20th-century Italian painters
Italian male painters
Italian centenarians
Olympic competitors in art competitions
Men centenarians
People from Trento
20th-century Italian male artists